Pavel Vorobey (born September 10, 1997) is a Belarusian professional ice hockey Defenseman who is currently an unrestricted free agent. He most recently played for HC Vityaz in the Kontinental Hockey League (KHL).

He previously played with Kunlun Red Star and Sibir Novosibirsk in the KHL. He joined Kunlun Red star from HC Dinamo Molodechno in the Belarusian Extraliga.

Vorobey is a part of the Belarusian national team and participated in the 2017 IIHF World Championship.

References

External links

1997 births
Living people
Belarusian ice hockey defencemen
HC Kunlun Red Star players
Lahti Pelicans players
Metallurg Novokuznetsk players
HC Sibir Novosibirsk players
Ice hockey people from Minsk
HC Vityaz players
Yunost Minsk players